General Trelawny may refer to:

Charles Trelawny (1653–1731), British Army major general
Harry Trelawny (1726–1800), British Army lieutenant general
Henry Trelawny (c. 1658–1702), British Army brigadier general